William Abelyan (born 27 September 1978) is a retired Armenian professional boxer.

Career 
Abelyan started boxing at the age of 12, and began training with the legendary Olympic Bronze Medalist David Torosyan. He started to box professionally in 1998. Abelyan had once defeated Orlando Salido, who would later be ranked the number one featherweight in the world. William was an WBO NABO Featherweight Champion and was a WBO #1 ranked contender. He was named fighter of the year in 2005. He upset former world champion Guty Espadas Jr., winning their 10-round fight by decision. Abelyan challenged Scott Harrison for the WBO Featherweight title, but lost. William is now retired from the sport of boxing.

See also
 List of Armenian boxers

References

External links 
 Harrison Gets Abelyan Date
 

1978 births
Living people
Armenian male boxers
Sportspeople from Yerevan
Southpaw boxers
American male boxers
Featherweight boxers